Oreta angularis is a moth in the family Drepanidae. It was described by Watson in 1967. It is found in China (Fujian, Zhejiang, Jiangxi, Guangdong, Hainan).

References

Moths described in 1967
Drepaninae